Braille is the fifth album from Json. Lamp Mode Recordings released the project on June 18, 2013.

Reception

Specifying in a four and a half star review by New Release Tuesday, Mark Ryan realizes, "Json, along with Spec have created a near perfect album." Mark Sherwood, indicating for Cross Rhythms in a nine out of ten review, replies, "the Iowa-based rapper delivers another powerful set." Signaling in a three and a half star review by The Christian Manifesto, Calvin Moore recognizes, "Braille is a return to form for him." In a 9.6 out of ten review by Justin Morden from Jam the Hype, responds, "With Braille, Json has released one of the best Christian Hip-Hop albums of the year."

Track listing

Charts

References

2013 albums
Json (rapper) albums